Wessam Salamana is a Syrian boxer. He is a two-time Olympic qualifier. At the 2012 Summer Olympics, he was defeated in his first bout in the  bantamweight competition by Kanat Abutalipov.

Salamana left war-torn Syria for Germany in 2015 with his wife and children. He eventually resumed his boxing training in Voelklingen.

In June 2021, he was awarded qualification for the Tokyo Olympics as a member of the  Refugee Olympic Team. He fought in the lightweight division after the elimination of the Olympic men's bantamweight division. Salamana lost his opening bout to Brazil's Wanderson de Oliveira by unanimous decision.

References

Living people
Olympic boxers of Syria
Boxers at the 2012 Summer Olympics
Bantamweight boxers
1985 births
Asian Games medalists in boxing
Boxers at the 2010 Asian Games
Syrian male boxers
Asian Games bronze medalists for Syria
Medalists at the 2010 Asian Games
People from Homs Governorate
Refugee Olympic Team at the 2020 Summer Olympics
Boxers at the 2020 Summer Olympics